The Hudson River League was formed in 1903 as a class D minor baseball league after playing one season in 1886. Upgraded to Class C the next season, it continued through 1907 before collapsing. There were twelve cities that represented the league during the five-year run; eleven came from New York State and one each at various points from New Jersey and Massachusetts. The Poughkeepsie Colts became the only team to win more than one league title, taking home the league crown in 1886, 1904 and 1907. The "HR" league disbanded June 18, 1907 and did not attempt a comeback the next season.

Cities represented

Albany, NY: Albany Senators 1886
Catskill, NY:  Catskill 1903
Glens Falls, NY & Saratoga Springs, NY: Glens Falls-Saratoga Springs 1906
Hudson, NY:  Hudson Marines 1903–1907
Kingston, NY: Kingston 1886; Kingston Colonials 1903–1906; Kingston Colonial Colts 1907
Newburgh, NY: Newburgh 1886; Newburgh Taylor-mades 1903–1905; Newburgh Hill Climbers 1906; Newburgh Hillies 1907
Ossining, NY:  Ossining 1903
Paterson, NJ:  Paterson Intruders 1904; Paterson Invaders 1905–1906; Paterson Intruders 1907
Peekskill, NY:  Peekskill 1903; Peekskill 1905
Pittsfield, MA:  Pittsfiled Hillies 1905
Poughkeepsie, NY: Poughkeepsie 1886; Poughkeepsie Colts 1903–1907
Saratoga Springs, NY: Saratoga Springs 1886
Saugerties, NY: Saugerties 1903–1905
Troy, NY: Troy Trojans 1886
Yonkers, NY: Younkers 1905, 1907

Standings & statistics

1886 

1886 Hudson River League
 Albany disbanded May 29.

1903 Class D
1903 Hudson River League
Ossining (7–37) moved to Catskill August 2; Peekskill entered the league August 10 on equal footing with Poughkeepsie, 21–24. Peekskill's actual record was 27–15. (officially 48–39.)No playoffs scheduled and no individual stats available.

1904 Class C
1904 Hudson River League
Paterson Played home games at Patterson & Clifton, NJNo playoffs were scheduled.

Player Statistics

1905
1905 Hudson River League
Peekskill & Yonkers disbanded June 1.; Saugerties (8–34) moved to Pittsfield July 4, then disbanded July 25.No playoffs were scheduled.

Player Statistics

1906
1906 Hudson River League
The season was shortened to September 9.
No playoffs were scheduled.

Player statistics

1907
1907 Hudson River League
Kingston disbanded June 1; Paterson disbanded June 2.The league disbanded June 18.

Hall of Fame alumni
Dan Brouthers 1904-1905 Poughkeepsie Colts

Sources
The Encyclopedia of Minor League Baseball: Second Edition

Baseball leagues in New York (state)
Defunct minor baseball leagues in the United States
Baseball leagues in Massachusetts
Sports leagues established in 1886
Sports leagues disestablished in 1907
1903 establishments in New York (state)
1907 disestablishments in the United States
Baseball leagues in New Jersey